This lists ranks Louisiana skyscrapers that stand at least 250 feet (76 m) tall, based on standard height measurement. This includes spires and architectural details but does not include antenna masts. An equal sign (=) following a rank indicates the same height between two or more buildings. The "Year" column indicates the year in which a building was completed.

Timeline of tallest buildings in Louisiana

See also
 List of tallest buildings in New Orleans
 List of tallest buildings in Baton Rouge
 Le Méridien New Orleans

References
 List of tallest buildings in New Orleans

External links
Emporis.com - Baton Rouge
Emporis.com - New Orleans
Emporis.com - Shreveport
Emporis.com - Lake Charles
Emporis.com

Louisiana
 
Tallest